Thine Eyes Bleed is the second full-length album by the melodic death metal/thrash metal band Thine Eyes Bleed. Released, April 15, 2008 through The End Records.

Track listing

Personnel
 Justin Wolfe - Vocals
 James Reid - Lead guitar
 Jeff Phillips - Guitar
 Johnny Araya - Bass
 Darryl Stephens - Drums
 Morgan Lander - Guest vocals on "Dark White"
 Lenzig Leal - Guest vocals on "Truth in Evil"
Siegfried Meier - producer, engineer

Sources

2008 albums
Thine Eyes Bleed albums
The End Records albums
Albums produced by Siegfried Meier